In proof theory, the Dialectica interpretation is a proof interpretation of intuitionistic arithmetic (Heyting arithmetic) into a finite type extension of primitive recursive arithmetic, the so-called System T.  It was developed by Kurt Gödel to provide a consistency proof of arithmetic. The name of the interpretation comes from the journal Dialectica, where Gödel's paper was published in a 1958 special issue dedicated to Paul Bernays on his 70th birthday.

Motivation 
Via the Gödel–Gentzen negative translation, the consistency of classical Peano arithmetic had already been reduced to the consistency of intuitionistic Heyting arithmetic. Gödel's motivation for developing the dialectica interpretation was to obtain a relative consistency proof for Heyting arithmetic (and hence for Peano arithmetic).

Dialectica interpretation of intuitionistic logic  
The interpretation has two components: a formula translation and a proof translation.

Formula translation 

Proof translation (soundness) 

Characterisation principles 
It has also been shown that Heyting arithmetic extended with the following principles

 Axiom of choice
 Markov's principle
 Independence of premise for universal formulas

is necessary and sufficient for characterising the formulas of HA which are interpretable by the Dialectica interpretation.

Extensions of basic interpretation 
The basic dialectica interpretation of intuitionistic logic has been extended to various stronger systems. Intuitively, the dialectica interpretation can be applied to a stronger system, as long as the dialectica interpretation of the extra principle can be witnessed by terms in the system T (or an extension of system T).

Induction 
Given Gödel's incompleteness theorem (which implies that the consistency of PA cannot be proven by finitistic means) it is reasonable to expect that system T must contain non-finitistic constructions. Indeed this is the case. The non-finitistic constructions show up in the interpretation of mathematical induction. To give a Dialectica interpretation of induction, Gödel makes use of what is nowadays called Gödel's primitive recursive functionals, which are higher-order functions with primitive recursive descriptions.

Classical logic 
Formulas and proofs in classical arithmetic can also be given a Dialectica interpretation via an initial embedding into Heyting arithmetic followed by the Dialectica interpretation of Heyting arithmetic. Shoenfield, in his book, combines the negative translation and the Dialectica interpretation into a single interpretation of classical arithmetic.

Comprehension 
In 1962 Spector
 extended Gödel's Dialectica interpretation of arithmetic to full mathematical analysis, by showing how the schema of countable choice can be given a Dialectica interpretation by extending system T with bar recursion.

Dialectica interpretation of linear logic 
The Dialectica interpretation has been used to build a model of Girard's refinement of intuitionistic logic known as linear logic, via the so-called Dialectica spaces. Since linear logic is a refinement of intuitionistic logic, the dialectica interpretation of linear logic can also be viewed as a refinement of the dialectica interpretation of intuitionistic logic.

Although the linear interpretation in Shirahata's work  validates the weakening rule  (it is actually an interpretation of affine logic), de Paiva's  dialectica spaces interpretation does not validate weakening for arbitrary formulas.

Variants of the Dialectica interpretation 
Several variants of the Dialectica interpretation have been proposed since. Most notably the Diller-Nahm variant (to avoid the contraction problem) and Kohlenbach's monotone and Ferreira-Oliva bounded interpretations (to interpret weak Kőnig's lemma). 
Comprehensive treatments of the interpretation can be found at 
, 
 and.

References 

Proof theory
Intuitionism
1958 introductions